The  was an EMU type operated by Nagoya Railroad (Meitetsu) in Japan between 1955 and 1986.

History
The fleet was withdrawn by 1986, donating bogies and electrical equipment to the later 5300 series EMUs.

Interior
The trains featured flip-over transverse seating.

References

External links
 

Electric multiple units of Japan
5000 series
Train-related introductions in 1955
1955 in rail transport

1500 V DC multiple units of Japan